Greater Manchester Central was, from 1984 to 1999, a European Parliament constituency centered on Greater Manchester, in North West England.

Prior to its uniform adoption of proportional representation in 1999, the United Kingdom used first-past-the-post for the European elections in England, Scotland and Wales. The European Parliament constituencies used under that system were smaller than the later regional constituencies and only had one Member of the European Parliament each.

Boundaries
1984–1994: Altrincham and Sale, Davyhulme, Manchester Blackley, Manchester Central, Manchester Gorton, Manchester Withington, Manchester Wythenshawe, Stretford.

1994–1999: Cheadle, Hazel Grove, Manchester Blackley, Manchester Central, Manchester Gorton, Manchester Withington, Stockport, Stretford.

MEPs

Election results

References

External links
 David Boothroyd's United Kingdom Election Results 

European Parliament constituencies in England (1979–1999)
Politics of Greater Manchester
1984 establishments in England
1999 disestablishments in England
Constituencies established in 1984
Constituencies disestablished in 1999